Dhai Chaal is an upcoming Pakistani film, directed by Taimoor Sherazi and produced by Irfan Ashraf. The film is written by Farheen Choudhry and stars Shamoon Abbasi, Ayesha Omer, Humayoun Ashraf, and Adnan Shah Tipu. The film revolves around Balochistan and the struggles faced by its local population to keep peace and harmony. As of October 11, 2022, the film has been delayed.

Cast 
 Shamoon Abbasi
 Ayesha Omer as Kanwal
 Humayoun Ashraf
 Adnan Shah Tipu
Rasheed Naz
Saleem Mairaj
Taqi Ahmed

Production

Casting 
Saba Qamar was initially reported to star in the film. However, she denied the news. Shamoon Abbasi revealed that, ''I'm playing the part of Kulbhushan Jadhav, the RAW agent from India, who was arrested by Pakistani authorities in March, 2016.'' Ayesha Omer revealed that she will portray a journalist in the film.

Filming 
A large part of the film was shot in Quetta, Pakistan.

Release 
First teaser of the film was released in April 2021.

See also
 Cinema of Pakistan
 Lollywood

References

External links

Urdu-language Pakistani films
Pakistani action films
Unreleased Pakistani films